Shakarrao Deo (January 4, 1894 - December 30, 1974) aka Nanasaheb Deo was an Indian freedom fighter and the founder of Satkaryottejak Sabha.

He participated in Quit India Movement and was arrested. He served as general secretary of Congress in 1947.

He was a member of Constituent Assembly of India in 1949. He was First Secretary of the Maharashtra Pradesh Congress Committee, 1920, and General secretary of the Congress, 1946–50, where he played a key role during the drafting of the Constitution of India and the transfer-of-power negotiations.

References

1894 births
1974 deaths
People from Dhule
Members of the Constituent Assembly of India
Indian National Congress politicians
Gandhians
Indian independence activists from Maharashtra